The Children's Museum of Cleveland (CMC) was established in 1981 and is located in the Midtown neighborhood of Cleveland, Ohio.

History

Originally, it was located in the University Circle area of Cleveland until January 3, 2016. One University Circle was built on its former location.

After renovation and designing all new exhibits, the museum opened at its new location on November 6, 2017. The Children's Museum of Cleveland is fully ADA accessible.

Exhibits
The museum has four permanent exhibits:

 Adventure City
 Wonder Lab
 Arts & Parts
 Making Miniatures

External links

References

Goodrich-Kirtland Park
Museums in Cleveland
Children's museums in Ohio